Governor Hansen may refer to:

Claus Hansen (died 1706), Governor of the Danish West Indies from 1702 to 1706
Clifford Hansen (1912–2009), 26th Governor of Wyoming